Bienvenido Morejón Marañón (born May 15, 1986), also known as Bienve, is a professional footballer who plays as a striker for Villarubia and the Philippines national team.

Born in Spain, Bienve played in the lower leagues of his birth country. In 2015, moved to the Philippines to sign with United City, then known as Ceres–Negros, playing for several years with the Filipino club. In 2021, he received Filipino citizenship, enabling him to play for the Philippines national team.

Early life
Bienve was born in El Puerto de Santa María, Province of Cádiz, Andalusia, and grew up in neighbouring Cádiz. He spent his childhood playing football in the streets, as his parents could not afford to send him to an academy.

Club career

Spain
Bienve made his senior debut when he was in Spain with local club CD Rayo Sanluqueño in the 2005–06 season. In the third quarter of 2007 he signed with Cádiz CF, being assigned to the reserves in Tercera División.

On December 2, 2007, Bienve appeared in his first game as a professional, coming on as a late substitute in a 3–1 home win against Racing de Ferrol in the Segunda División. He totalled 58 minutes for the first team, who were eventually relegated.

On April 7, 2010, Bienve was released by Cádiz due to indiscipline. He joined fourth-level club Villarrubia CF 14 days later, and scored a career-best 21 goals during the campaign.

Bienve moved to fellow league team CD Móstoles in the 2011 off-season, returning to Villarrubia the following transfer window and subsequently resuming his career in the fourth tier, where he represented La Hoya Lorca CF and UD Socuéllamos. With the latter, he achieved promotion to Segunda División B in 2014.

Ceres–Negros / United City
On May 14, 2015, Bienve moved abroad for the first time in his career, after agreeing a deal with Filipino United Football League side Ceres FC. He was encouraged by former Cádiz teammate Carli de Murga to play for them as early as 2012. After one month at the club, he was not satisfied with his performance and decided to study Chieffy Caligdong's style of play in a bid to improve himself.

Bienve considered retiring in 2016 due to the death of his father, but was encouraged by coach Risto Vidaković to continue playing football. He became the all-time top scorer in the AFC Cup on 11 March 2020, when he scored his 35th goal in the renamed Ceres–Negros's 4–0 win against Bali United FC.

Ceres–Negros was taken over by a new management in July 2020, being renamed United City FC. Bienve was among the players retained. He would leave the club by January 5, 2022.

Johor Darul Ta'zim
Marañon joined Johor Darul Ta'zim of the Malaysia Super League by January 20, 2022.

National team
Marañón originally was not eligible to play for the Philippine national team prior to receiving Filipino citizenship in 2020 via naturalization. On March 3, 2020, Philippine Senator Juan Miguel Zubiri sponsored a Senate bill proposing to grant Filipino citizenship to Marañón, which would make him eligible for the Philippines national team. In September, bills were filed in the House of Representatives proposing the same. Those were approved on February 16, 2021, while the corresponding Senate bill was approved on March 15. On July 2, Marañón became a Filipino citizen when the bill was signed into law as Republic Act No. 11570 by President Rodrigo Duterte.

Marañón was first called up to play for the Philippine national team for the 2020 AFF Championship, which was postponed by a year due to the COVID-19 pandemic. He debuted for the Philippines in a 1–2 loss against hosts Singapore during the tournament's first matchday on December 8, 2021. During the second matchday against Timor-Leste on December 11, Marañón scored his first international goal by scoring the sixth goal of a 7–0 win for the Philippines.

International goals

Personal life
Marañón is of Basque ethnicity. His Basque grandfather also had links to the Philippines, having fled from Spain to settle in the Western Visayas due to his opposition to Spanish dictator Francisco Franco.

Honours
Ceres–Negros / United City
Philippines Football League: 2017, 2018, 2019, 2020
Copa Paulino Alcantara: 2019

Individual
 AFC Cup top goalscorer: 2019, 2020
Philippines Football League Golden Boot: 2020
AFF Championship joint top scorer: 2020

Career statistics

Club

Notes

References

External links

1986 births
Living people
People from El Puerto de Santa María
Sportspeople from the Province of Cádiz
Spanish footballers
Footballers from Cádiz
Spanish people of Basque descent
Association football wingers
Segunda División players
Segunda División B players
Tercera División players
Real Betis players
Cádiz CF B players
Cádiz CF players
Villarrubia CF players
CD Móstoles footballers
Lorca FC players
UD Socuéllamos players
Ceres–Negros F.C. players
Filipino footballers
Filipino people of Spanish descent
Naturalized citizens of the Philippines
Filipino people of Basque descent
Philippines international footballers